Uzbekistan competed at the 2000 Summer Olympics in Sydney, Australia. 70 competitors, 52 men and 18 women, took part in 69 events in 12 sports.

Medalists

Athletics

Men's Competition
Men's 400 m Hurdles
 Erkinjon Isakov
 Round 1 – 50.71 (did not advance)

Men's 4 × 100 m
 Nikolay Eroshenko, Konstantin Juravlev, Oleg Juravlyov, Anvar Kuchmuradov
 Round 1 – 41.2 (did not advance)

Men's Discus
 Roman Poltoratskiy
 Qualifying – 47.83 (did not advance)

Men's Javelin Throw
 Sergey Voynov
 Qualifying – 75.89 (did not advance)

Men's Hammer Throw
 Vitaly Khojatelev
 Qualifying – 65.04 (did not advance)
 Victor Ustinov
 Qualifying – 60.60 (did not advance)
 Andrey Abduvaliev
 Qualifying – 75.64 (did not advance)

Men's Long Jump
 Rustam Khusnutdinov
 Qualifying – 7.24 (did not advance)

Men's Triple Jump
 Yevgeniy Petin
 Qualifying – 15.27 (did not advance)

Men's Decathlon
 Oleg Veretelnikov
 100 m – 12.17
 Long Jump – DNS
 Shot Put – DNS

Women's competition
Women's 100 m
 Lyubov Perepelova
 Round 1 – 11.48
 Round 2 – 11.59 (did not advance)

Women's 200 m
 Lyubov Perepelova
 Round 1 – 23.83 (did not advance)

Women's 400 m
 Elena Piskunova
 Round 1 – 55.40 (did not advance)

Women's 4 × 100 m
 Lyudmila Dmitriadi, Guzel Khubbieva, Elena Kviatkovskaya, Lyubov Perepelova
 Round 1 – 45.14 (did not advance)

Women's 4 × 400 m
 Zamira Amirova, Natalya Kobina, Elena Piskunova, Natalya Senkina
 Round 1 – 03:43.96 (did not advance)

Women's Heptathlon
 Safiya Kabanova
 100 m Hurdles – 14.89
 High Jump – 1.72
 Shot Put – 11.56
 200 m – 27.27
 Long Jump – 5.22
 Javelin Throw – 36.61
 800 m – 02:20.11
 Points – 5101 (27th place)

Boxing

Men's Light Flyweight (– 48 kg)
Dilshod Yuldashev
Round 1 – Lost to Suban Punnon of Thailand (→ did not advance)

Men's Bantamweight (– 54 kg)
Alisher Rahimov
Round 1 – Defeated Suk-Hwan Cho of Korea
Round 2 – Defeated Hichem Blida of Algeria
Quarterfinal – Lost to Raimkoul Malakhbekov of Russia (→ did not advance)

Men's Featherweight (– 57 kg)
Tulkunbay Turgunov
Round 1 – Defeated Kassim Napa Adam of Uganda
Round 2 – Lost to Somluck Kamsing of Thailand (→ did not advance)

Men's Light Welterweight (– 63.5 kg)
Mahammatkodir Abdoollayev →  Gold Medal
Round 1 – Defeated Miguel Cotto of Puerto Rico
Round 2 – Defeated Kelson Santos of Brazil
Quarterfinal – Defeated Sergei Bukovski of Belarus
Semifinal – Defeated Mohamed Allalou of Algeria
Final – Defeated Ricardo Williams of United States

Men's Welterweight (– 67 kg)
Sherzod Husanov
Round 1 – Defeated Babak Moghimi of Iran
Round 2 – Lost to Vitalie Gruşac of Moldova (→ did not advance)

Men's Light Middleweight (– 71 kg)
Dilshod Yarbekov
Round 1 – Lost to Adnan Catic of Germany (→ did not advance)

Men's Middleweight (– 75 kg)
Utkirbek Haydarov
Round 1 – Lost to Gaidarbek Gaidarbekov of Russia (→ did not advance)

Men's Light Heavyweight (– 81 kg)
Sergei Mikhailov →  Bronze Medal
Round 1 – Defeated Rasco Grigore Claudiu of Romania
Round 2 – Defeated Ali Ysmajlov of Azerbaijan
Quarterfinal – Defeated Olzhas Orazaliyev of Kazakhstan
Semifinal – Lost to Alexander Lebziak of Russia

Men's Heavyweight (– 91 kg)
Ruslan Chagaev
Round 1 – Bye 
Round 2 – Defeated Alexandr Yatsenko of Ukraine
Quarterfinal – Lost to Vladimir Tchantouria of Georgia (→ did not advance)

Men's Super Heavyweight (+ 91 kg)
Rustam Saidov →  Bronze Medal
Round 1 – Bye 
Round 2 – Defeated Ahmed Abdel Samad of Egypt
Quarterfinal – Defeated Art Binkowski of Canada
Semifinal – Lost to Mukhtarkhan Dildabekov of Kazakhstan

Canoeing

Flatwater

Men's Competition
Men's Kayak Singles 500 m
 Anton Ryahov
 Qualifying Heat – 01:42.694
 Semifinal – 01:43.292 (→ did not advance)

Men's Kayak Singles 1000 m
 Anton Ryahov
 Qualifying Heat – 03:43.718
 Semifinal – 03:44.109 (→ did not advance)

Fencing

One female fencer represented Uzbekistan in 2000.

Women's épée
 Anisa Petrova

Gymnastics

Judo

Shooting

Swimming

Men's 50 m Freestyle
 Ravil Nachaev
 Preliminary Heat – 23.12 (→ did not advance)

Men's 100 m Freestyle
 Alexander Agafonov
 Preliminary Heat – 52.58 (→ did not advance)

Men's 200 m Freestyle
 Oleg Tsvetkovskiy
 Preliminary Heat – 1:54.93 (→ did not advance)

Men's 100 m Butterfly
 Ravil Nachaev
 Preliminary Heat – 55.21 (→ did not advance)

Men's 200 m Butterfly
 Dmitriy Tsutskarev
 Preliminary Heat – 02:10.54 (→ did not advance)

Men's 200 m Breaststroke
 Sergey Voytsekhovich
 Preliminary Heat – 02:30.23 (→ did not advance)

Men's 200 m Individual Medley
 Oleg Pukhnatiy
 Preliminary Heat – 02:06.01 (→ did not advance)

Men's 4 × 100 m Freestyle
 Oleg Tsvetkovskiy, Oleg Pukhnatiy, Petr Vasilev, and Ravil Nachaev
 Preliminary Heat – DSQ (→ did not advance)

Women's 50 m Freestyle
 Saida Iskandarova
 Preliminary Heat – 28.08 (→ did not advance)

Women's 100 m Butterfly
 Mariya Bugakova
 Preliminary Heat – 01:09.94 (→ did not advance)

Women's 200 m Breaststroke
 Anastasiya Korolyova
 Preliminary Heat – 02:43.23 (→ did not advance)

Tennis

Trampolining

Weightlifting

Men

Wrestling

Notes

Wallechinsky, David (2004). The Complete Book of the Summer Olympics (Athens 2004 Edition). Toronto, Canada. . 
International Olympic Committee (2001). The Results. Retrieved 12 November 2005.
Sydney Organising Committee for the Olympic Games (2001). Official Report of the XXVII Olympiad Volume 1: Preparing for the Games. Retrieved 20 November 2005.
Sydney Organising Committee for the Olympic Games (2001). Official Report of the XXVII Olympiad Volume 2: Celebrating the Games. Retrieved 20 November 2005.
Sydney Organising Committee for the Olympic Games (2001). The Results. Retrieved 20 November 2005.
International Olympic Committee Web Site

References

Nations at the 2000 Summer Olympics
2000
Olympics